3DR may refer to
3D Realms, American video game publisher and developer
3D Robotics, American unmanned aerial vehicle maker